Yam is a rural locality (a village) in Posyolok Nikologory, Vyaznikovsky District, Vladimir Oblast, Russia. The population was 17 as of 2010.

Geography 
Yam is located 29 km southwest of Vyazniki (the district's administrative centre) by road. Klimovskaya is the nearest rural locality.

References 

Rural localities in Vyaznikovsky District